The List of top-division football clubs in Asian Football Confederation (AFC) countries. The Asian Football Confederation (AFC) includes all countries within the Asian territory as members, except Abkhazia, Armenia, Artsakh, Azerbaijan, Chagos Islands, Christmas Island, Cocos Islands, Cyprus, Northern Cyprus, Egypt, Georgia, Israel, Kazakhstan, Russia, South Ossetia and Turkey, as most of them are affiliated with another confederation, or none at all. The AFC also includes as members the Oceanian countries of Australia, Guam, and the Northern Mariana Islands.

Each of the AFC member countries have their own football league systems. The clubs playing in each top-level league compete for the title as the country's club champions, and also for places in next season's AFC club competitions: the AFC Champions League, the AFC Cup. Due to promotion and relegation, the clubs playing in the top-level league are different every season; however, some league systems (such as Australia) do not have promotion and relegation.

The champions of the previous season in each country are listed in bold.

'Some clubs play in a national football league other than their own country's. Where this is the case the club is noted as such. In particular, the Australian A-League includes a team from New Zealand, whose national federation is a member of the Oceania Football Confederation.
For clubs playing at lower divisions, see List of second division football clubs in AFC countries.
For clubs belonging to any of the other five continental football confederations of the world, see List of association football clubs.

League ranking 

League rankings are calculated based on the points earned by clubs while playing in Asian club competitions and are used to determine the country's quota in Asian club competitions.

Afghanistan

Football association:
Afghanistan Football Federation

Top-level league:
Afghan Premier League

2022 AFC ranking: 40th

As of 2020 season:

Australia

Football association: Football Australia
Top-level league:
A-League (men)
W-League (women)
2022 AFC ranking: 20th

A-League Men
As of 2022–23 A-League Men season:

A-League Women
As of 2022–23 A-League Women season:

Bahrain 
 

Football association:
Bahrain Football Association
(Al-Ittiḥād Al-Baḥraynī Likurat Al-Qadam)
Top-level league:
Bahraini Premier League
(Ad-Dawrī Al-Baḥraynī Al-Mumtāz)
2022 AFC ranking: 24th

As of 2022–23 season:

Bangladesh 

Football association:
Bangladesh Football Federation
(Bānlādēśa Phuṭabala Phēḍārēśana) 
Top-level league:
Bangladesh Premier League
(Bānlādēśa Primiẏāra Liga)
2022 AFC ranking: 22nd 

As of 2022−23 season:

Bhutan 

Football association:
Bhutan Football Federation

Top-level league: Bhutan Premier League
2022 AFC ranking: 38th

As of 2022 season:

Brunei Darussalam 

Football association:
Football Association of Brunei Darussalam
(Persatuan Bolasepak Brunei Darussalam) 
Top-level league:
Brunei Super League
(Liga Super Brunei) 
2022 AFC ranking: 40th 

As of 2021 season:

Cambodia 

Football association:
Football Federation of Cambodia
()
Top-level league:
Cambodian Premier League
(Li K Kampoul Kămpŭchéa) 
2022 AFC ranking: 33rd 

As of 2022 season:

China People Republic 

Football association:
Chinese Football Association
(Zhōngguó Zúqiú Xiéhuì)
Top-level league:
Chinese Super League
(Zhōngchāo Liánsài)
2022 AFC ranking: 15th

As of 2022 season:

Chinese Taipei 

See Chinese Taipei for the naming issue.

Football association:
Chinese Taipei Football Association
(Zhōnghuá Mínguó Zúqiú Xiéhuì)
Top-level league:
Taiwan Football Premier League
(Táiwān Qǐyè Jiǎ Jí Zúqiú Liánsài)
2022 AFC ranking: 30th

As of 2022 season:

Democratic People Republic of Korea 

Football association:
DPR Korea Football Association
(Joseon Minjujuui Inmin Gonghwaguk Chukgu Hyeophoe)
Top-level league:
DPR Korea Premier Football League
(Joseon Minjujuui Inmin Gonghwaguk Hana Bulyuchug Gulyeon Maengjeon)
2022 AFC ranking: 19th

As of 2019-20 season:

Guam 

Football association: Guam Football Association
Top-level league: Guam Soccer League
2022 AFC ranking: 40th 

As of 2019–20 season:

Hong Kong 

Football association:
Hong Kong Football Association
(Xiānggǎng Zúqiú Zǒnghuì)
Top-level league:
Hong Kong Premier League
(Xiānggǎng Chāojí Liánsài)
2022 AFC ranking: 7th

As of 2022–23 season:

India 

Football Association:
All India Football Federation

 Top-level league: 
Indian Super League

Indian Women's League (women)

2022 AFC ranking: 16th

Indian Super League
As of 2022-23 Indian Super League season :

Indian Women's League
As of 2021-22 Indian Women's League season:

Indonesia

 
Football association:
Football Association of Indonesia

Top-level league: 
Liga 1 (men)
 
Liga 1 Putri (women)

2022 AFC ranking: 27th

Liga 1
As of 2022−23 season:

Liga 1 Putri
As of 2022 Liga 1 Putri season:

Iraq 

Football association:
Iraq Football Association
(Al-Ittiḥād Al-ʿIrāqī Likurat Al-Qadam)
Top-level league:
Iraqi Premier League
(Ad-Dawrī Al-ʿIrāqī Al-Mumtāz)
2022 AFC ranking: 14th

As of 2022–23 season:

Iran 

Football association:
Football Federation Islamic Republic of Iran
(Federasiun-e Futbal-e Jimhuri-ye Islâmi-ye Iran)
Top-level league:
Persian Gulf Pro League
(Lig-e Bartar-e Khalij-e Fārs)
2022 AFC ranking: 5th

As of 2022–23 season:

Japan 

Football association:
Japan Football Association
(Nihon Sakkā Kyōkai)
Top-level league: 
J1 League (men)
(Jē Wan Rīgu) 
WE League (women)
(WE Rīgu)
2022 AFC ranking: 2nd

J1 League
As of 2022 season:

WE League
As of 2022–23 season:

Jordan 

Football association:
Jordan Football Association
(Al-Ittiḥād Al-Urdunī Likurat Al-Qadam)
Top-level league:
Jordanian Pro League
(Ad-Dawrī Al-Urdunī Limuḥtarifīn)
2022 AFC ranking: 9th

As of 2022 season:

Korea Republic 

Football association:
Korea Football Association
(Daehan Chukgu Hyeophoe)
Top-level league:
K League 1
(K Ligeu Hana)
2022 AFC ranking: 3th

As of 2022 season:

Kuwait 

Football association:
Kuwait Football Association
(Al-Ittiḥād Al-Kuwaytī Likurat Al-Qadam)
Top-level league:
Kuwait Premier League
(Ad-Dawrī Al-Kuwaytī)
2022 AFC ranking: 21st

As of 2022–23 season:

Kyrgyz Republic 

Football association:
Kyrgyz Football Union
(Qyrğyz Futbol Birligy)
Top-level league:
Kyrgyz Premier League
(Qyrğyz Premjer Ligasy)
2022 AFC ranking: 29th

As of 2022 season:

Laos 

Football association:
Lao Football Federation
(Sahaphan Bante Aehngsad Lav)
Top-level league:
Lao Premier League
(Lav Phri Mia Lik)
2022 AFC ranking: 37th

As of 2022 season:

Lebanon 

Football association:
Lebanese Football Association
(Al-Ittiḥād Al-Lubnānī Likurat Al-Qadam)
Top-level league:
Lebanese Premier League
(Ad-Dawrī Al-Lubnānī Al-Mumtāz)
2022 AFC ranking: 23th

As of 2022–23 season:

Macau

Football association:
Macau Football Association
(Àomén Zúqiú Xiéhuì)
Top-level league:
Liga de Elite
(Jīngyīng Liánsài)
2022 AFC ranking: 40th

As of 2022 season:

Malaysia

Football association:
Football Association of Malaysia
(Persatuan Bola Sepak Malaysia)
Top-level league:
Malaysia Super League
(Liga Super Malaysia)
2022 AFC ranking: 10th

As of 2023 season:

Maldives 

Football association: Football Association of Maldives
Top-level league: Dhivehi Premier League
2022 AFC ranking: 36th

As of 2022-23 season:

Mongolia 

Football association:
Mongolian Football Federation
(Mongolyn Khölbömbögiin Kholboo)
Top-level league:
Mongolian National Premier League
(Mongolyn Undesnii Deed Lig)
2022 AFC ranking: 39th

As of 2021–22 season:

Myanmar 

Football association:
Myanmar Football Federation

Top-level league:
Myanmar National League

2022 AFC ranking: 31th

As of 2022 season:

Nepal 

Football association:
All Nepal Football Association

Top-level league: 
Nepal Super League

Martyr's Memorial A-Division League

2022 AFC ranking: 34th

Martyr's Memorial A-Division League 
As of 2021–22 season:

Nepal Super League 
As of 2022 season:

Northern Mariana Islands

Football association: Northern Mariana Islands Football Association
Top-level league: M*League Division 1
2022 AFC ranking: 40th

As of 2019 season:

Oman 

Football association:
Oman Football Association
(Al-Ittiḥād Al-ʿUmānī Likurat Al-Qadam)
Top-level league:
Oman Professional League
(Dawrī Al-Muḥtarifīn ʿUmān)
2022 AFC ranking: 32th

As of 2021–22 season:

Pakistan 

Football association:
Pakistan Football Federation

Top-level league:
Pakistan Premier League

2022 AFC ranking: 40th

As of 2021–22 season:

Palestine 

Football association:
Palestinian Football Association
(Al-Ittiḥād Al-Filasṭīnī Likurat Al-Qadam)
Top-level league: 
Gaza Strip Premier League
(Ad-Dawrī Al-Mumtāz Al-Filasṭīnī Al-Qiṭāʿu Ġazzah) 
West Bank Premier League
(Ad-Dawrī Al-Mumtāz Al-Filasṭīnī Aḍ-Ḍiffah Al-Ġarbiyyah)
2022 AFC ranking: 28th

Gaza Strip Premier League
As of 2018–19 season:

West Bank Premier League
As of 2019–20 season

Philippines

Football association:
Philippine Football Federation
)
Top-level league: 
Philippines Football League (men)

PFF Women's League (women)

2022 AFC ranking: 25th

Philippines Football League
As of the 2022 season:

PFF Women's League
As of the 2019-20 season:

Qatar 

Football association:
Qatar Football Association
(Al-Ittiḥād Al-Qaṭrī Likurat Al-Qadam)
Top-level league:
Qatar Stars League
(Dawrī Nujūm Qaṭr)
2022 AFC ranking: 6th

As of 2022-23 season:

Saudi Arabia 

 Football association:
Saudi Arabian Football Federation 
(Al-Ittiḥād Al-ʿArabī As-Saʿūdī Likurat Al-Qadam)
 Top-level league:
Saudi Professional League
(Dawrī Al-Muḥtarifīn As-Saʿūdī)
2022 AFC ranking: 1st
 
As of 2022-23 season:

Singapore 

Football association: Football Association of Singapore
Top-level league: 
Singapore Premier League (men)
Women's Premier League (women)
2022 AFC ranking: 18th

As of 2023 season:

Deloitte Women's Premier League
As of the 2022 season:

Sri Lanka 

Football association:
Football Sri Lanka
(Pāpandu Srī Laṁkāva)
Top-level league:
Sri Lanka Super League
(Srī Laṁkā Cæmpiyans Līgaya)
2022 AFC ranking: 35th

As of 2021 season:

Syria 

Football association: 
Syrian Football Federation 
(Al-Ittiḥād Al-ʿArabi As-Sūriyā Likurat Al-Qadam)
Top-level league: 
Syrian Premier League
(Ad-Dawrī As-Sūriyā Al-Mumtāz)
2022 AFC ranking: 26th

As of 2021-22 season:

Tajikistan 

Football association:
Tajikistan Football Federation
(Federosijuni futboli Tojikiston)
Top-level league:
Tajikistan Higher League
(Ligai Olii Tojikiston)
2022 AFC ranking: 13th

As of 2022 season:

Thailand 

Football association:
Football Association of Thailand
(S̄mākhm Kīḷā Futbxl h̄æ̀ng Pratheṣ̄thịy Nı Phrabrm Rāchūpt̄hạmp̣h̒)
Top-level league:
Thai League 1
(Thịy Līk H̄nụ̀ng)
2022 AFC ranking: 11st

As of 2022-23 season:

Timor-Leste 

Football association:
East Timor Football Federation

Top-level league: Liga Futebol Amadora Primeira Divisão
2022 AFC ranking: 40th

As of 2022 season:

Turkmenistan 

Football association:
Football Federation of Turkmenistan

Top-level league:
Ýokary Liga 

2022 AFC ranking: 17th

As of 2022 season:

United Arab Emirates 

Football association:
United Arab Emirates Football Association
(Al-Ittiḥād Al-Imārātī Likurat Al-Qadam)
Top-level league:
UAE Pro League
(Dawrī Al-Muḥtarifīn Lidawlat Al-Imārāt Al-ʿArabīyah Al-Muttaḥidah)
2022 AFC ranking: 8th

As of 2022-23 season:

Uzbekistan 

Football association:
Uzbekistan Football Association

Top-level league:
Uzbekistan Super League

2022 AFC ranking: 4th

As of 2022 season:

Vietnam 

Football association:
Vietnam Football Federation

Top-level league:
V.League 1

2022 AFC ranking: 12th

As of 2022 season:

Vietnam Women's Football League
As of the 2022 season:

Yemen 

Football association: 
Yemen Football Association 
(Al-Ittiḥād Al-Yamanī Likurat Al-Qadam)
Top-level league:
Yemeni League
(Ad-Dawrī Al-Yamanī)
AFC ranking: 40th

As of 2014–15 season:

See also
List of second division football clubs in AFC countries
List of top-division football clubs in CAF countries
List of top-division football clubs in CONCACAF countries
List of top-division football clubs in CONMEBOL countries
List of top-division football clubs in OFC countries
List of top-division football clubs in UEFA countries
List of top-division football clubs in non-FIFA countries
List of second division football clubs in UEFA countries
Domestic football champions

References 

+Asia
Association football in Asia